Paranair S.A. (legally Compañía de Aviación Paraguaya S.A.) is a Paraguayan airline based at Silvio Pettirossi International Airport, in the country's capital of Asunción. It utilizes a fleet of Bombardier CRJ100/200 aircraft to operate scheduled flights between Paraguay and other South American countries.

History

The airline was founded in 2015 as Amaszonas Paraguay, originally as a joint venture between Air Nostrum and Amaszonas. As Amaszonas Paraguay, the airline's first flight took place on 23 September 2015. On 19 June 2018, the airline announced its separation and independence from the Amaszonas group of airlines by rebranding the company as Paranair. The company's joint backers became Inversiones en Lineas Aereas Internacionales and  Avmax Group Inc. from Spain and Canada respectively, with each company holding a 50% stake in Paranair. Operations under the Paranair name began on 15 October 2018.

Destinations
, Paranair offers or has previously offered scheduled flights to the following destinations:

 
a. Route operated by Paranair on behalf of LATAM Paraguay as wet lease.

Codeshare agreements
Paranair has a codeshare agreement with LATAM Paraguay.

Fleet

, Paranair operates the following aircraft:

See also
List of airlines of Paraguay

References

External links

Airlines of Paraguay
Airlines established in 2015
2015 establishments in Paraguay